Bernareggi may refer to:

 Adriano Bernareggi, Italian Catholic archbishop
 Domenico Bernareggi, Italian churchman
 Museo Adriano Bernareggi, a museum in Bergamo, Italy

See also 
 Bernareggio